John Fust (born March 5, 1972) is a Canadian-Swiss professional ice hockey coach and a former professional ice hockey player.

Playing career 
Born in Montreal, Quebec, Fust played ice hockey at Princeton University. Following graduating in 1994 he turned pro and spent the remainder of his career in Switzerland, playing in the country's first and second division. He won the championship in Switzerland's second-tier division National League B (NLB) with SC Herisau in 1997 and with SC Langnau one year later, helping both clubs to promotion to the top-flight National League A (NLA). Fust played in a total of 266 NLA contests for Langnau and HC Ambrì-Piotta, before spending the last two years of his playing career in the NLB, turning out for HC Forward Morges and HC Sierre.

Coaching career 
Following the end of his playing career, Fust started an education at the Canadian Security Intelligence Service, while working as a volunteer assistant coach of a college team.

Fust kicked off his head coaching career at Swiss NLB side EHC Visp in December 2007. He guided Visp to the NLB finals in 2010 and left the club at the end of the 2009-10 season to take charge of NLA team SCL Tigers, where he had spent five years as a player. Fust coached the Tigers to a sixth-place finish in the 2010-11 NLA regular season and their first ever trip to the NLA playoffs. He was relieved of his head coaching duties in December 2012 after a series of eight straight losses.

He was named assistant coach of NLA side Lausanne HC for the 2013-14 campaign and opted to leave the team after one year to work for the Swiss ice hockey federation: Fust served as assistant to head coach Glen Hanlon on the men's national team and took over the head coaching job at the Swiss U20 national team. After Hanlon stepped aside in October 2015, Fust served as interim head coach of the Swiss national team during the 2015 Deutschland-Cup and was then succeeded by Patrick Fischer. Fust remained in his position at the U20 national team until his contract with the Swiss ice hockey federation ended in 2016.

In April 2016, he signed a contract to return to EHC Visp. He took over the head coaching job at the club. In March 2017, he parted ways with the club after falling to HC La Chaux-de-Fonds in the NLB quarterfinals. Fust was named head coach of Swiss National League team Lausanne HC on February 8, 2018, replacing Yves Sarault. He stayed on the job until the end of the 2017-18 season and took over the job as head of the youth development at Lausanne in May 2018. Additionally, he was named an assistant coach for the Danish Men's National Team in April 2019.

Career statistics

Personal 
Fust's grandparents emigrated from St. Gallen, Switzerland to Canada in the 1920s.

External links

References 

1972 births
Living people
Denmark men's national ice hockey team coaches
EHC Olten players
HC Ambrì-Piotta players
HC Forward-Morges players
HC Martigny players
HC Sierre players
Princeton University alumni
Princeton Tigers men's ice hockey players
SC Herisau players
SCL Tigers players
Ice hockey people from Montreal
Swiss ice hockey coaches
Swiss ice hockey forwards